Little Dorrit is a 1934 German drama film directed by Karel Lamač and starring Gustav Waldau, Anny Ondra, and Hilde Hildebrand. It is an adaptation of Charles Dickens' 1857 Victorian era novel Little Dorrit, and made a sharp contrast to the light comedies and musicals that Ondra usually appeared in. The film's sets were designed by the art directors Wilhelm Depenau and Erich Zander.

Cast

References

Bibliography
 Farina, William. Screening Charles Dickens: A Survey of Film and Television Adaptations. McFarland, 2022.

External links

Films of Nazi Germany
German historical drama films
Films directed by Karel Lamač
Films based on British novels
Films based on Little Dorrit
Films set in the 19th century
Films set in England
Films set in London
German black-and-white films
Bavaria Film films
Films shot at Bavaria Studios
1934 drama films
1930s German films